Fredrik Oduya (May 31, 1975 in Stockholm – September 2011) was a Swedish  ice hockey player. He was drafted 154th overall by the San Jose Sharks of the United States in the 1993 NHL Entry Draft.

Career
After the International Hockey League with the Kansas City Blades and the American Hockey League for the Kentucky Thoroughblades, Oduya was traded to the Calgary Flames in 1999 for Eric Landry.  He never played in the National Hockey League, although belonging to both the San Jose Sharks and later the  Calgary Flames organisations.

Known as a good fighter and tough hitter, Oduya was nicknamed "Freddy Knuckles" and "The Swedish Nightmare".

In 2000, he retired due to a back injury. He came out of retirement in 2004 to play in Sweden and Great Britain, before retiring again in 2007.

Personal
His father was originally from Kenya and was a member of the Luo ethnic group, who married a Swedish woman and they had two sons, Fredrik and Johnny Oduya. Both became professional ice hockey players who played for North American teams. Johnny has won two Stanley Cups with the Chicago Blackhawks.

Fredrik Oduya died in a motorcycle accident in the summer of 2011.

External links

References

1975 births
2011 deaths
Edinburgh Capitals players
Guelph Storm players
Black ice hockey players
Kansas City Blades players
Kentucky Thoroughblades players
Laredo Bucks players
Nybro Vikings players
Orlando Solar Bears (IHL) players
Ottawa 67's players
Ice hockey people from Stockholm
Saint John Flames players
San Jose Sharks draft picks
Swedish expatriate ice hockey players in Canada
Swedish expatriate ice hockey players in the United States
Swedish ice hockey defencemen
Swedish people of Kenyan descent
Swedish sportspeople of African descent
Swedish people of Luo descent
Motorcycle road incident deaths
Road incident deaths in Austria
Swedish expatriate sportspeople in Scotland
Expatriate ice hockey players in Scotland